Helictes is a genus of parasitoid wasps belonging to the family Ichneumonidae.

The species of this genus are found in Europe, Northern America and New Zealand.

Species:
 Helictes borealis (Holmgren, 1857) 
 Helictes carinalis Humala, 2007

References

Ichneumonidae
Ichneumonidae genera